The 1892 Dissolution Honours List was issued in August 1892 following the general election of that year.

The recipients of honours are displayed as they were styled before their new honour.

Earl and Marquess

The Right Honourable Lawrence, Earl of Zetland, by the names, styles, and titles of Earl of Ronaldshay, in the county of Orkney and Zetland, and Marquess of Zetland

Baron and Earl

The Right Honourable Gathorne, Viscount Cranbrook   by the names, styles, and titles of Baron Medway, of Hemsted in the county of Kent, and Earl of Cranbrook in the said county

Earl
The Right Honourable Gilbert Henry, Baron Willoughby de Eresby, by the name, style, and title of Earl of Ancaster in the county of Lincoln

Baron

William Amhurst Tyssen-Amherst,  by the name, style, and title of Baron Amherst of Hackney, in the county of London
Sir Thomas Brooks  by the name, style, and title of Baron Crawshaw, of Crawshaw, in the County Palatine of Lancaster, and of Whatton, in the county of Leicester
Sir Archibald Campbell Campbell  by the name, style, and title of Baron Blythswood, of Blythswood, in the county of Renfrew
The Right Honourable George Cubitt, by the name, style, and title of Baron Ashcombe, of Dorking, in the county of Surrey, and of Bodiam Castle, in the county of Sussex
Sir Rainald Knightley  by the name, style, and title of Baron Knightley, of Fawsley, in the county of Northampton
William John Legh, by the name, style, and title of Baron Newton, of Newton-in-Makerfield, in the County Palatine of Lancaster
John Mulholland, by the name, style, and title of Baron Dunleath, of Ballywalter, in the county of Down
John Allan Rolls,  by the name, style, and title of Baron Llangattock, of the Heudre, in the county of Monmouth

Privy Councillor
The Queen appointed the following to Her Majesty's Most Honourable Privy Council:

The Right Honourable Christopher Palles, Lord Chief Baron of the Court of Exchequer in Ireland
Sir Matthew White Ridley 
Jesse Collings 
Alexander Staveley Hill 
Thomas Henry Huxley

Baronets
Captain G. C. Armstrong
Edward Hamer Carbutt
Frederick Dixon Dixon-Hartland 
Colonel Charles Hamilton
Frederick Seager Hunt 
Horace Townsend Farquhar
John Jaffray
Edward Levy-Lawson
Thomas Lea 
John Muir, Lord Provost of Glasgow
Baron von Schröder
Mark John Stewart  Honorary Colonel of the 1st Ayrshire and Galloway Volunteer Artillery 
The Right Honourable George Osborne Morgan

Knight Bachelor
Ellis Ashmead-Bartlett 
John Blundell Maple 
George Irwin, JP for Leeds
John Benjamin Stone
Dr. William Smith 
Douglas Straight
Joseph Henry Warner, Grocer's Company
William Renny Watson,  Chairman of the Glasgow South-Western Railway Company

References

1892 in the United Kingdom
Dissolution Honours
1892 awards